Altai is a sum (district) of Govi-Altai Aimag (province) in western Mongolia. It is located in the south of the aimag, and is not to be confused with the aimag capital, which is also named Altai, but located in the Yesönbulag sum.

Wolves are a problem in the district, and in 2001 the local government approved a wolf hunting contest, which as of 2003 had killed 56 adult wolves and 40 cubs. The government also encourages well digging in the district and runs a contest.

References

Districts of Govi-Altai Province